Number, Please is a 1931 British crime film directed by George King and starring Mabel Poulton, Warwick Ward and Richard Bird. It was a quota quickie made at the Nettlefold Studios in Walton-upon-Thames.

Cast
 Mabel Poulton as Peggy
 Warwick Ward as Curtis Somers
 Richard Bird as Jimmy
 Frank Perfitt as McAllister
 Iris Darbyshire as Vamp
 Gladys Hamer as Darkie
 Norman Pierce as Inspector
 Quentin McPhearson
 Anita Sharp-Bolster

References

Bibliography
 Low, Rachael. Filmmaking in 1930s Britain. George Allen & Unwin, 1985.
 Wood, Linda. British Films, 1927-1939. British Film Institute, 1986.

External links

1931 films
British crime films
British black-and-white films
1931 crime films
Films directed by George King
Films set in England
Films shot at Nettlefold Studios
Quota quickies
Telephony in popular culture
20th Century Fox films
1930s English-language films
1930s British films